Achlya is a genus of moths belonging to the subfamily Thyatirinae of the Drepanidae.

Species
 Achlya flavicornis Linnaeus, 1758
 Achlya jezoensis (Matsumura, 1927)
 Achlya hoerburgeri (Schawerda, 1924)
 Achlya longipennis Inoue, 1972
 Achlya tateyamai Inoue, 1982

Former species
 Achlya kuramana Matsumura, 1933

References

Thyatirinae
Drepanidae genera